Chris Long is an American football defensive end.

Chris Long may also refer to:

Chris Long (director), director of Weeds and Smallville
Chris Long (basketball), college basketball coach
Chris Long (footballer), association football player
Chris Long (rugby union) (born 1985), Canadian rugby player

See also
Christopher Long (disambiguation)
Kris Long, Chicago news anchor
Kristin Long, ballerina